Revenge is the fifth studio album by New York hardcore band Cro-Mags. It was released in 2000 on their own label Cro-Mag Recordings and was the band's first studio album in seven years, as well as their first release with guitarist Rocky George (formerly of Suicidal Tendencies) and its first without vocalist John Joseph since 1989's Best Wishes. As he did on Best Wishes, bassist Harley Flanagan handled the vocals on this album. Revenge was also the Cro-Mags' last full-length studio album until the release of In the Beginning in 2020.

Release and reception 

In an AllMusic review, Patrick Kennedy said "Appearing nearly a decade after the previous album, the largely disappointing Near Death Experience, Harley Flanagan resuscitated the Cro-Mags -- at least temporarily -- and issued a few albums in 2000. Revenge, a disc of studio material from the newest incarnation (also with original guitarist Parris Mayhew and Suicidal Tendencies' Rocky George), is surprisingly good hardcore. Fortunately for long-time fans, the Cro-Mags, with Harley singing in place of the deposed John Joseph, who were often considered the toughest of the New York acts, have not mellowed with age, nor followed any crossover metal/rap hybrid trends. In fact, Revenge is stone-solid, and as beefy as a slab of Angus. What's most peculiar is the sudden emergence of more melodic aspects beneath the imposing tough-guy veneer. This is melodic hardcore along the lines of early-'80s Misfits, and bears immediate sonic resemblance to Walk Among Us. Assuredly, Flanagan's vocals are menacing, which, of course, is what one would expect and probably hope for.".

Track listing 
All songs written by Flanagan and Mayhew.

Personnel 
 Harley Flanagan – bass, vocals
 Rocky George – lead guitar
 Parris Mitchell Mayhew – rhythm guitar
 Dave di Censo – drums

References 

Century Media Records albums
2000 albums
Cro-Mags albums